Karl Bruckner (January 9, 1906 – October 25, 1982) was an Austrian children's writer.

Committed to peace, international understanding, and social justice, he became one of Austria's leading writers for young people.

Life 
The son of a printer, Bruckner grew up in the Viennese suburb of Ottakring and became a motor mechanic. He began to write in 1946. He travelled widely.

Awards 
the City of Vienna Children's Book Prize – 1954 for Giovanna und der Sumpf
Austrian Children's Book Prize – 1956 for Die Strolche von Neapel
the City of Vienna Youth Book Prize – 1957 for Der goldene Pharao
Austrian Children's Book Prize – 1961 for Sadako will leben ('The Day of the Bomb')

Books 
Giovanna und der Sumpf (1954)
Die Strolche von Neapel (1955)
The Golden Pharaoh (English translation, 1959)
Viva Mexico (1962)
The Day of the Bomb (1962) (English translation of Sadako will leben, (Sadako wants to live) (1961), published in more than 122 countries and in 22 languages )
Nur zwei Roboter? (1963) (translated in English as Hour of the Robots by Frances Lobb, 1964 )
Die Spatzenelf (2000)

References

External links 
 Karl Bruckner

Austrian children's writers
People from Ottakring
1906 births
1982 deaths